Süleyman Alper Çağlar (born September 1, 1981 in Ankara, Turkey), is Turkish film director, editor and screenwriter.

Life 
He was born in Ankara on September 1, 1981, as the second child of his family.

Alper Caglar directed his first documentary film called "Not So Far Away" in Kyrgyzstan in the second year of high school. After he finished his high school then Alper received scholarships to study in USA and he studied at the University of Virginia in USA. He completed his studies with Media Relations, Communication and finally Graphic Design Department at Bilkent University.

Filmography

References 

Turkish film directors
1981 births
Living people
People from Ankara